Ashok Shinde (born 6 July 1961) is an Indian film and stage actor, who works in Marathi cinema, known for films like Rangat Sangat . He has acted and produced Marathi film, making him one of the most successful actors in the Marathi film and television industry.

Filmography

Television

References

External links
 

Indian male film actors
Living people
Male actors in Marathi cinema
Male actors in Marathi theatre
Indian male soap opera actors
Indian male comedians
Male actors from Mumbai
Marathi actors
20th-century Indian male actors
1961 births
Male actors in Marathi television